Airen Mylene Tjon-A-Tsien (born Utrecht, 22 August 1985) is a Dutch presenter of Suriname descent.

Between July and December 2020, Mylene was the temporary news presenter at the Radio 538 Coen en Sander Show. She replaced news presenter Jo van Egmond during her vacation and maternity leave.

Television

References

Surinamese women
1985 births
Dutch radio journalists
Dutch radio presenters
Dutch women radio presenters
Dutch television journalists
Dutch women journalists
Living people
Mass media people from Utrecht (city)